Sikiru Ololade Ayinde Balogun, MFR, (9 February 1948 – 16 December 2010) better known by his stage name Ayinde Barrister was a Nigerian-born Yoruba singer-songwriter, songproducer and music performer. He is regarded as a pioneer of Fuji and Wéré music. After his first break into music in 1965, Ayinde Barrister went on to release over 70 studio albums.

Early life
Ayinde Barrister was born on 9 February 1948, to the family of Salawu Balogun who was a trader from Ibadan, and his father was a butcher.

Education 
He had his early education at Muslim Mission School and the Model School, Mushin, Lagos. He later studied typing and other commercial related classes at Yaba Polytechnic.

Career 
Ayinde Barrister started playing music at a young age as an ajiwere singer during the period of Ramadan; he continued playing music in between various jobs. He worked as a typist, also known today as a secretary, for Nigerian Breweries and was later enlisted as a clerk in the Nigerian Army during the Nigeria Civil War. He served in the 10th Brigade of the 2nd Division of the Nigerian Army under Col Adeniran and fought in Awka, Abagana and Onitsha. On his return from the war, he was posted to the Army Signals Headquarters, Apapa and later to the Army Resettlement Centre, Oshodi. He left the army to become a full-time musician and proceeded to start a full-fledged band of 34 percussionists and vocalists called the "Supreme Fuji Commanders".

Music career
In 1966, Ayinde Barrister released his first LP record. During the time, he usually played with his band at events around Ebute Meta and Lagos mostly to Muslim clients. He released further records under the label African Songs Ltd before starting his own label Siky-Oluyole Records. Among the LP's released under African songs is Bisimilahi (1977) and Ile Aiye Dun Pupo/Love in Tokyo (India Sound) (1976). By the early 1980s, Ayinde Barrister and Fuji music had become accepted by all religions in the country. He went on to record various albums including Iwa (1982), Nigeria (1983), Fuji Garbage (1988) and New Fuji Garbage (1993) under his imprint. He had a popular record titled Reality (2004). He had a bitter feud with another Fuji singer, Kollington Ayinla in 1982.

Ayinde Barrister had a couple of successful shows in London in 1990 and 1993 performing what later became known as the Fuji Garbage sound.

Musical style
His Fuji Music is a blend of earlier traditional musical genres of Apala, Sakara, Awurebe and others. With Fuji Music, Barrister revolutionized traditional Yoruba music while still projecting traditional values of good behaviour, respect for elders and the struggles against life's forces. He often used his music as a tool of commentary on issues of national concern, especially, politics. He was blessed in the art of praising enigmatic..

Awards
Dr. Sikiru Ayinde Barrister earned so many notable awards during his lifetime and music career however the most significant is the conferment of the honor of Member of the Order of the Federal Republic (MFR) by the then President of the Federal Republic of Nigeria in 2006, President Olusegun Aremu Obasanjo. The honour is believed to be based on his album Precaution released in 1995, the record that detailed the whole issues confronting Nigeria as a nation and possible solutions to the National problems.
In 1983, he was awarded an honorary PhD in music at the City University of Los Angeles

Selected discography

 Ejeka Gbo T’Olorun (7″; Niger Songs ??) (1966)
 Vol.1: Waya Rabi
 Vol.2: Alayinde Ma De O
 Vol.3: Mecca Special
 Vol.4: Itan Anobi Rasao
 Vol.5: E Sa Ma Mi Lengbe
 Vol.6: Ori Mi Ewo Ninse / Majority Boy (1975)
 Vol.7: Ile Aiye Dun Pupo / Love in Tokyo (India Sound) (1975)
 Vol.8: Fuji Exponent (1976)
 Vol.9
Vol. 10 (African Songs, 1977) 
 Bisimilai (African Songs, 1977) 
 Omo Nigeria (African Songs, 1977)
 Olojo Eni Mojuba (Siky Oluyole, 1978) 
 Our Late Artistes (Siky Oluyole, 1978) 
 London Special (Siky Oluyole, 1979)
 Fuji Reggae Series 2 (Siky Oluyole, 1979) 
 Eyo Nbo Anobi (Siky Oluyole, 1979) 
 Awa O Ja (Siky Oluyole, 1979) 
 Fuji Disco (Siky Oluyole, 1980) 
 Oke Agba (Siky Oluyole, 1980) 
 Aiye (Siky Oluyole, 1980) 
 Family Planning (Siky Oluyole, 1981) 
 Suru Baba Iwa (Siky Oluyole, 1981) 
 Ore Lope (Siky Oluyole, 1981) 
 E Sinmi Rascality (Siky Oluyole, 1982)
 Iwa (Siky Oluyole, 1982)
 Ise Logun Ise (No More War) (Siky Oluyole, 1982)
 Eku Odun (Siky Oluyole, 1982) 
 Ijo Olomo (Siky Oluyole, 1983) 
 Nigeria (Siky Oluyole, 1983) 
 Love (Siky Oluyole, 1983) 
 Barry Special (Siky Oluyole, 1983) 
 Military (Siky Oluyole, 1984) 
 Appreciation (Siky Oluyole, 1984) 
 Fuji Vibration 84/85 (Siky Oluyole, 1984)
 Destiny (Siky Oluyole, 1985) 
 Superiority (Siky Oluyole, 1985)
 Fertiliser (Siky Oluyole, 1985)
 Okiki (Siky Oluyole, 1986) 
 Inferno(Siky Oluyole, 1996)
 America Special (Siky Oluyole, 1986) 
 Ile Aye Ogun (Siky Oluyole, 1987) 
 Maturity (Siky Oluyole, 1987) 
 Barry Wonder (Siky Oluyole, 1987) 
 Wonders at 40 (Siky Oluyole, 1987) 
 Fuji Garbage (Siky Oluyole, 1988) 
 Fuji Garbage Series II (Siky Oluyole, 1988) 
 Current Affairs (Siky Oluyole, 1989) 
 Fuji Garbage Series III (Siky Oluyole, 1989)
 Music Extravaganza (Siky Oluyole, 1990) 
 Fuji Waves (Siky Oluyole, 1991) 
 Fantasia Fuji (Siky Oluyole, 1991) 
 Fuji Explosion (Siky Oluyole, 1992) 
 Dimensional Fuji (Siky Oluyole, 1993) 
 New Fuji Garbage (Siky Oluyole, 1993) 
 The Truth (Siky Oluyole, 1994) 
 Precaution (Siky Oluyole, 1995) 
 Olympics Atlanta ’96 cassette (Siky Oluyole, 1996) 
 Olympics ’96 London Version cassette (Zmirage Productions, 1997) 
 with Queen Salawa Abeni Evening Of Sound cassette (Zmirage Productions, 1997) 
 Barry On Stage cassette (Siky Oluyole, 1997) 
 Mr. Fuji (Barry Black, 1998)
 "Millennium Stanza" (Fuji Chambers, 2000)
 "Controversy" (2005)
 ' Reality and Questionnaire ' ( 2008).
 Superiority
 Fuji Booster
 Fuji Missile
Wisdom and correction
Image and Gratitude

References

Bibliography

External links

1948 births
2010 deaths
Yoruba musicians
People from Oyo State
20th-century Nigerian male singers
21st-century Nigerian male singers
Yoruba-language singers
Musicians from Ibadan
Yoruba military personnel
Military personnel of the Nigerian Civil War
Nigerian military personnel